Impatiens serusiauxii is a species of flowering plant in the family Balsaminaceae. Native to Madagascar, it was formally described as a new species in 2020 by Eberhard Fischer, Elisette Rahelivololona, and Dorothee Killmann. The specific epithet honours the Belgian lichenologist Emmanuël Sérusiaux, who accompanied Fischer on a collecting trip where the type was collected. It was previously mistaken for Impatiens manaharensis, which differs slightly in morphology such as leaf shape, and flower colour and structure.

See also
 List of Impatiens species

References

serusiauxii
Endemic flora of Madagascar
Plants described in 2020
Flora of the Madagascar subhumid forests